This is a list of radio stations in the Waikato Region of New Zealand.

Most Waikato stations originate from Hamilton, Thames and Taupo.

Hamilton
The following stations broadcast in the Hamilton area.

FM stations

AM stations

Low power FM stations

Coromandel Peninsula
The following stations broadcast in the Coromandel Peninsula region.

FM stations

Low power FM stations

Taupo and Turangi
Stations broadcasting in the Taupo and Turangi areas.

FM and AM stations

Low power FM stations

References

Waikato
Waikato